Marcel Bacou (3 March 1936 – 14 March 2010) was a French football referee.

Career 
Bacou was born in Tours, France. He officiated three international friendly matches between 1980 and 1983.

In club football, he officiated some UEFA competition matches, such as two in the UEFA Champions League and one in the UEFA Cup. He refereed 231 Division 1 matches between 1970 and 1983.

Personal life and death 
Bacou was an activist of Unión de Asociaciones Familiares (UNAF). He died on 14 March 2010, at the age of 74, due to an illness.

References and notes

External links 
 Profile on WorldReferee.com
 Profile on FootballFacts.ru (in Russian)

1936 births
2010 deaths
French football referees
Sportspeople from Tours, France
UEFA Champions League referees
UEFA Europa League referees